The Siuslaw River is a river, about  long, that flows to the Pacific Ocean coast of Oregon in the United States.

It flows generally west-northwest through the mountains, past Swisshome, entering the Pacific at Florence.

It is part of the homeland of the Siuslaw people, after whom it is named. Citizens of the Siuslaw nation lived in villages along the river until 1860 when they were forcibly removed to an Indian reservation in Yachats whereupon their homes, farms, gardens and villages were destroyed and occupied by U.S. settler-colonists.

The valley of the river has been one of the productive timber regions in Oregon. The lower course of the river passes through Siuslaw National Forest.

The Coos Bay branch of the Coos Bay Rail Link crosses many bridges as it follows the narrow, winding valley of the Siuslaw River to the swing bridge at Cushman.

The river has historically been a spawning ground for Chinook and coho salmon. Although the Chinook population is substantial, coho numbers have declined from an annual average of 209,000 fish between 1889 and 1896 to just over 3,000 fish between 1990 and 1995. The estuary of the river is surrounded by extensive wetlands that are a significant habitat for migratory birds along the coast. It is one of the very few Western Oregon rivers where all major forks are undammed.

See also
 List of longest streams of Oregon
 List of rivers of Oregon
 North Fork Siuslaw River
 Siuslaw jetties
 Siuslaw River Bridge

References

External links
 
 Oregon Coastal Atlas: Siuslaw River estuary

Rivers of Oregon
Rivers of Lane County, Oregon
Oregon placenames of Native American origin